The Big 12/SEC Women's Challenge is an NCAA Division I women's college basketball series that takes place early in the season, consisting of a series of games featuring members of the Big 12 Conference and Southeastern Conference.

In the first two seasons of the challenge (2014–15 and 2015–16), only two members of each conference were involved. Starting in the 2016–17 season, the series expanded to include all 10 members of the Big 12 and an equal number of the 14 SEC teams.

Since the 2016–17 season, the challenge is similar in format to the previously existing ACC–Big Ten Challenge and men's Big 12/SEC Challenge.

The series between the two conferences, as of 2020, is at 2–1–4, with the SEC leading.

Series History

2021–22

2020–21

2019–20

2018–19

2017–18

2016–17

2015–16

2014–15

Team records

Big 12 Conference (1–2–4)

Southeastern Conference (2–1–4) 

Because the conferences do not have the same number of members (SEC has 14, Big 12 has 10) four teams from the SEC are excluded from participation each year. The number of times an SEC team is excluded is shown in the "Out" column in the table above (updated to include 2019–20 challenge).

See also
 Big 12/SEC Challenge

References

External links 
 http://www.big12sports.com/ViewArticle.dbml?ATCLID=209524285
 http://www.big12sports.com/ViewArticle.dbml?ATCLID=210054889

College women's basketball competitions in the United States
Big 12 Conference women's basketball
Southeastern Conference women's basketball